West Takone is a rural locality in the local government areas of Waratah-Wynyard and Circular Head in the North West region of Tasmania.
The 2016 census determined a population of 8 for the state suburb of West Takone.

History
The locality was originally gazetted as Takone West. It was re-gazetted as West Takone in 1974.

Geography
The Arthur River forms most of the western boundary, and the Hellyer River forms the south-western boundary as it flows to its junction with the Arthur.

Road infrastructure
The C236 route (Takone Road) enters from the east and runs through to the north-west before exiting.

References

Localities of Waratah–Wynyard Council
Localities of Circular Head Council
Towns in Tasmania